Esch is a village in the Dutch province of North Brabant. It is located in the municipality of Boxtel.

History 
The village was first mentioned in 773 or 774 as Hesc, and probably means "ash (Fraxinus excelsior) forest". Esch is a church village which developed in the Early Middle Ages along the Esserstroom. The Abbey of Echternach had possessions in Esch back in the 8th century.

The tower of the St Willibrordus Church dates from the late-15th century. The church was built between 1926 and 1927 in Byzantine Revival style. The convert Sancta Monica was built in 1895 by the missionary sisters Onze-Lieve-Vrouwe van Afrika (Our Lady of Africa). In 2012, the convent was convert into an apartment building.

Esch was home to 245 people in 1840. Esch was a separate municipality until 1996, when it was merged with Haaren.

Gallery

References

Municipalities of the Netherlands disestablished in 1996
Populated places in North Brabant
Former municipalities of North Brabant
Boxtel